Materials Science and Engineering: C  was a peer-reviewed scientific journal that has since been renamed to Biomaterials Advances.

According to the Journal Citation Reports, the journal had a 2020 impact factor of 7.328.

References

External links
 

Physics review journals
Materials science journals
Elsevier academic journals
Publications established in 1993
English-language journals
Monthly journals